27thAnnie Awards
November 6, 1999

Best Feature Film: 
The Iron Giant

Best Television Program: 
The Simpsons

Best Home Video Production: 
The Lion King II: Simba's Pride

Best Short Subject: 
Blue Bunny

The 27th Annual Annie Awards were held on November 6, 1999.

Winners are marked in bold text.

Production nominees

Best Animated Feature
 A Bug's Life
 The Iron Giant
 The Prince of Egypt
 South Park: Bigger, Longer & Uncut
 Tarzan

Best Animated Home Entertainment Production
 The Land Before Time VI: The Secret of Saurus Rock
 The Lion King II: Simba's Pride
 Pocahontas II: Journey to a New World
 Scooby-Doo on Zombie Island

Best Animated Interactive Production
 The Goddamn George Liquor Program - Spumco, Inc.Best Animated Short Subject
 Al Tudi Tuhak
 Bunny
 Living Forever
 More

Best Animated Television Commercial
 Gnome – "Hollywood Gum"
 Kraft Foods – "Tweety"
 Levi Strauss & Co. – "Sensitive"
 San Francisco Film Society – "Celebrate Being in the Dark"
 Old Navy – "Performance Fleece"

Best Animated Television Production
 Batman Beyond
 Futurama
 King of the Hill
 The New Batman/Superman Adventures
 The Simpsons

Individual achievement

Animated Effects
 Peter De Mund – Tarzan – Walt Disney Pictures
 Allen Foster – The Iron Giant – Warner Bros. Feature Animation
 Michel Gagné – The Iron Giant – Warner Bros. Feature Animation
 Joel Krasnove – The Angry Beavers – Nickelodeon Animation Studio
 Jamie Lloyd – The Prince of Egypt – DreamWorks Pictures

Character Animation
 Ken Duncan – Tarzan – Walt Disney Pictures
 Glen Keane – Tarzan – Walt Disney Pictures
 Steve Markowski – The Iron Giant – Warner Bros. Feature Animation
 Jim van der Keyl – The Iron Giant – Warner Bros. Feature Animation
 Dean Wellins – The Iron Giant – Warner Bros. Feature Animation

Directing in an Animated Feature Production
 Brad Bird – The Iron Giant – Warner Bros. Feature Animation
 Brenda Chapman, Steve Hickner and Simon Wells – The Prince of Egypt – DreamWorks Pictures
 Eric Darnell and Tim Johnson – Antz – DreamWorks Pictures and PDI
 John Lasseter and Andrew Stanton – A Bug's Life – Walt Disney Pictures and Pixar Animation Studios
 Kevin Lima and Chris Buck – Tarzan – Walt Disney Pictures

Directing in an Animated Television Production
 Mark Gustafson – "Bougie Nights", The PJs – Will Vinton Studios
 John McIntyre – "Mommie Fearest", The Powerpuff Girls – Cartoon Network Studios
 Nelson Recinos – "How I Spent My Weekend", Steven Spielberg Presents Pinky, Elmyra & the Brain – Warner Bros. Television Animation
 Dave Wasson – "Max & His Special Problem", Oh Yeah! Cartoons – Nickelodeon Animation Studio

Music in an Animated Feature Production
 Phil Collins (Composer and Lyricist) – "Two Worlds" (Song), Tarzan – Walt Disney Pictures
 Harry Gregson-Williams and John Powell (Composers) – Antz – DreamWorks Pictures and PDI
 Michael Kamen (Composer) – The Iron Giant – Warner Bros. Feature Animation
 Tom Snow (Composer), Marty Panzer and Jack Feldman (Lyricists) – "We Are One" (Song), The Lion King II: Simba's Pride – Walt Disney Television Animation
 Scott Warrender (Composer) and Joss Whedon (Lyricist) – "My Lullaby" (Song), The Lion King II: Simba's Pride – Walt Disney Television Animation

Music in an Animated Television Production
 Walter Murphy (Composer), Seth MacFarlane and David Zuckerman (Lyricists) – Main Title, Family Guy – 20th Century Fox Television
 Randy Rogel (Composer and Lyricist) – "That Is the Story That's Told by the Bard" (Song), Histeria! – Warner Bros. Television Animation
 J. Eric Schmidt and Cameron Patrick (Composers) – The San Francisco Beat (Episode), The Sylvester and Tweety Mysteries – Warner Bros. Television Animation
 Stephen James Taylor (Composer) – "Pluto's Arrow Error" (Episode), Mickey Mouse Works – Walt Disney Television Animation

Production Design in an Animated Feature Production
 John Bell – Antz – DreamWorks Pictures and PDI
 Alan Bodner – The Iron Giant – Warner Bros. Feature Animation
 William Cone – A Bug's Life – Walt Disney Pictures and Pixar Animation Studios
 Daniel St. Pierre – Tarzan – Walt Disney Pictures
 Mark Whiting – The Iron Giant – Warner Bros. Feature Animation

Production Design in an Animated Television Production
 Paul Harrod – "Boyz 'N' The Woods", The PJs – Will Vinton Studios
 Craig Kellman – "Uh Oh Dynamo", The Powerpuff Girls – Cartoon Network Studios
 Glen Murakami – "Legends of the Dark Knight", The New Batman/Superman Adventures – Warner Bros. Television Animation
 Sue Rose – "Friday", 4WD (Four Women Driving) – Walt Disney Television Animation
 Jay Stephens – "Sacred Identity", JetCat – Porchlight Entertainment

Storyboarding in an Animated Feature Production
 Mark Andrews – The Iron Giant – Warner Bros. Feature Animation
 Lorna Cook – The Prince of Egypt – DreamWorks Pictures
 Kevin O'Brien – The Iron Giant – Warner Bros. Feature Animation
 Brian Pimental – Tarzan – Walt Disney Pictures
 Dean Wellins – The Iron Giant – Warner Bros. Feature Animation

Storyboarding in an Animated Television Production
 Alex Kirwan – "The Man with No Nose", Oh Yeah! Cartoons – Nickelodeon Animation Studio
 Bob McKnight – "William Tell Overture", Mickey Mouse Works – Walt Disney Television Animation
 Mitch Schauer – "The Day the World Got Really Screwed Up", The Angry Beavers – Nickelodeon Animation Studio
 Adam Van Wyk – "Black Out", Batman Beyond – Warner Bros. Television Animation
 Dave Wasson – "Max & His Special Problem", Oh Yeah! Cartoons – Nickelodeon Animation Studio

Voice Acting in an Animated Feature Production
 Mary Kay Bergman – voice of Sheila Broflovski – South Park: Bigger, Longer & Uncut – Paramount Pictures
 Minnie Driver – voice of Jane – Tarzan – Walt Disney Pictures
 Ralph Fiennes – voice of Rameses – The Prince of Egypt – DreamWorks Pictures
 Eli Marienthal – voice of Hogarth Hughes – The Iron Giant – Warner Bros. Feature  Animation
 Suzanne Pleshette – voice of Zira – The Lion King II: Simba's Pride – Walt Disney Television Animation

Voice Acting in an Animated Television Production
 Charlie Adler – voice of Cow – Cow and Chicken – Cartoon Network Studios
 Tara Charendoff – voice of Bubbles – The Powerpuff Girls – Cartoon Network Studios
 Eddie Murphy – voice of Thurgood Stubbs – The PJs – Will Vinton Studios
 Rob Paulsen – voice of Pinky – Steven Spielberg Presents Pinky, Elmyra & The Brain – Warner Bros. Television Animation
 Cree Summer – voice of Elmyra – Steven Spielberg Presents Pinky, Elmyra & The Brain – Warner Bros. Television Animation

Writing in an Animated Feature Production
 Todd Alcott, Chris Weitz and Paul Weitz – Antz – DreamWorks Pictures and PDI
 Brad Bird and Tim McCanlies – The Iron Giant – Warner Bros. Feature Animation
 John Lasseter, Andrew Stanton, Joe Ranft, Donald McEnery and Bob Shaw – A Bug's Life – Walt Disney Pictures and Pixar Animation Studio.
 Tab Murphy, Bob Tzudiker and Noni White – Tarzan – Walt Disney Pictures
 Trey Parker, Matt Stone and Pam Brady – South Park: Bigger, Longer & Uncut – Paramount Pictures

Writing in an Animated Television Production
 Alan Burnett and Paul Dini – "Rebirth Part I", Batman Beyond – Warner Bros. Television Animation
 Jim Dauterive – "Hank's Cowboy Movie", King of the Hill – 20th Century Fox Television in association with Deedle-Dee Productions, Judgemental Films, and 3 Arts Entertainment
 Evan Dorkin and Sarah Dyer – "Lawsuit", Space Ghost Coast to Coast – Cartoon Network Productions, Inc.
 Ken Keeler – "The Series Has Landed", Futurama – The Curiosity Co. in association with 20th Century Fox Television
 Tim Long, Larry Doyle and Matt Selman – "Simpsons Bible Stories", The Simpsons – Gracie Films in association with 20th Century Fox Television

Juried awards

June Foray Award
Significant and benevolent or charitable impact on the art and industry of animation.
 Dave Master

Winsor McCay Award
Recognition of lifetime or career contributions to the art of animation.
 Marcell Jankovics
 Ray Patterson
 Ernie Con Pederson

Technical Achievement in the Field of Animation
 Eric Daniels

Certificate of Merit
 Melanie Crandall
 Michael Mallory

External links
 
 Annie Awards 1999 at Internet Movie Database

1999
1999 film awards
Annie
Annie